Scopula lacriphaga is a moth of the family Geometridae described by Hans Bänziger and David Stephen Fletcher in 1985. It is found in northern Thailand and south-western China.

References

Moths described in 1985
lacriphaga
Moths of Asia